Hartshorne (pronounced "Hearts-orn") is a city in Pittsburg County, Oklahoma, United States. It is the second largest city in the county. The population was 2,125 at the 2010 census.

Description
The community was named for Dr. Charles Hartshorne, a wealthy investor from Philadelphia, Pennsylvania, who was attracted by the potential profits offered by coal deposits in the area.

History
The present-day city of Hartshorne began as a coal mining community about 1850. Coal mine operators in the Indian Territory recruited European immigrants to work the mines. The first workers were probably English and Irish, but other ethnic groups soon joined them. These included Italians and eastern Europeans. Like many other such communities, this was a company town, built very close to the mine, with rudimentary houses and a company store. 

A post office opened at Hartshorne, Indian Territory on March 5, 1850.  It was named for Dr. Charles Hartshorne, a railroad official. Jones Academy was established southwest of Hartshorne in 1881.  At the time of its founding, Hartshorne was located in Gaines County, a part of the Moshulatubbee District of the Choctaw Nation.

The Choctaw Coal and Railway (CC&R) line, acquired by the town, was incorporated in 1887 and began building a  line between Wister and South McAlester. In 1894, the CC&R was reorganized and renamed the Choctaw, Oklahoma and Gulf Railroad (CO&G) in 1894. The Wister - South McAlester line was completed in 1900, and also linked to Wilburton, Alderson and Hartshorne. In 1902, the Chicago, Rock Island and Pacific Railway gained control of the CO&G. In 1904 an electric interurban began service from McAlester to Hartshorne.

The Holy Rosary Church, complete with a rectory, a convent, and a parochial school, was built in 1895 by Russian and other Eastern European immigrants. Other churches constructed before the 20th Century were:  Baptist, Methodist, Christian, Presbyterian, and Episcopal. The Saints Cyril and Methodius Russian Orthodox Greek Catholic Church, remains a landmark. Completed in 1916, it replaced an earlier 1897 version that immigrants from Russia and other eastern European countries constructed.

The Saints Cyril and Methodius church had been owned by the Sts. Cyril Methodius Orthodox Church, Inc.  On March 20, 2016, a man named Bill Melancon filed a quitclaim deed in the Pittsburg County Clerk's office, transferring ownership of the property to Melancon. The quitclaim deed had been signed by Bill O'Nesky, a church member, who Melancon claimed was a church trustee. Melanin also presented a Special Warranty Deed dated in 2010, by Bill O’Nesky, Tanya O’Nesky, and Foy Ledbetter, identified as successor trustees of the church. A group of church members first learned about the alleged sale soon afterward, when they found strangers on and inside the property. They filed suit in District Court. The case came before Judge James Bland in April 2016.  Judge Bland issued a restraining order to bar Melancon, his agents and representatives from coming on or within  of the property, or removing anything or making any changes before Bland revisited the case in June 2010. An out of court settlement between the church members before the date set by the judge resulted in the dismissal of the case, and a deed signed by Melanin transferring ownership back to the church.

The community incorporated in Tobucksy County of the Choctaw Nation by order of the U.S. District Court, Central District, Indian Territory, on March 1, 1900.

Hartshorne became part of Pittsburg County at statehood on November 16, 1907.

Geography
Hartshorne is located at  (34.845198, -95.559265).

Demographics

As of the census of 2010, there were 2,125 people, 850 households, and 551 families residing in the city. The population density was 614.5 people per square mile (233.2/km2). There were 991 housing units at an average density of 291.6 per square mile (112.5/km2). The racial makeup of the city was 65.9% White, 2.5% African American, 20.3% Native American, 0.20% Asian, 0.10% Pacific Islander, 1.1% from other races, and 9.7% from two or more races. Hispanic or Latino of any race were 3.6% of the population.

There were 850 households, out of which 35.8% had children under the age of 18 living with them, 43.4% were married couples living together, 14.6% had a female householder with no husband present, and 35.2% were non-families. 31.0% of all households were made up of individuals, and 35.8% had someone living alone who was 65 years of age or older. The average household size was 2.47 and the average family size was 3.06.

In the city, the population was spread out, with 34.3% under the age of 18, 8.0% from 18 to 24, 23.7% from 25 to 44, 23.6% from 45 to 64, and 19.5% who were 65 years of age or older. The median age was 37.7 years. For every 100 females, there were 89.2 males. For every 100 females age 18 and over, there were 83.7 males.

The median income for a household in the city was $21,078, and the median income for a family was $26,650. Males had a median income of $25,705 versus $18,603 for females. The per capita income for the city was $13,179. About 18.6% of families and 26.3% of the population were below the poverty line, including 33.0% of those under age 18 and 17.5% of those age 65 or over.

Education
The Hartshorne Public Schools system operates an elementary school, a junior high, and a high school. The city also has four head-start centers.

 northeast of Hartshorne is Jones Academy, a public boarding school for Native Americans with proof of their tribal heritage. Many tribal students come from the Choctaw Nation, whose territory encompasses Pittsburg County. The junior high/high school students attend the Hartshorne Public Schools, while Jones Academy has its own elementary.

Hartshorne Public Library is located in downtown Hartshorne.

Government
The mayor of Hartshorne announced her retirement and resigned her position abruptly on September 27, 2016. Trueblood's departure was reported by the McAlester News-Capital, which had no further information. The same article said that the FBI was investigating the possible misuse of city funds for personal purchases, and that several credit card statements bore the name of the former City Clerk, who had either been suspended or resigned.

The previous mayor had resigned his position after serving less than five months of his four-year term, citing personal reasons.

Notable people
 Ed Jeffers, former professional football player
 Richard Lerblance, Oklahoma state senator
 Anna Wallis Suh, the original voice of "Seoul City Sue" during the Korean War
 Warren Spahn, Hall of Fame baseball player

See also

& List of cities and towns in Oklahoma

Notes

References

External links

 
 Hartshorne Public Library
 Encyclopedia of Oklahoma History and Culture - Hartshorne

Cities in Oklahoma
Cities in Pittsburg County, Oklahoma
Populated places established in 1850